Giovanni de Gennaro or Giovanni de Guevara (died 1556) was a Roman Catholic prelate who served as Bishop of Sant'Agata de' Goti (1523–1556).

Biography
On 19 June 1523, Giovanni de Gennaro was appointed during the papacy of Pope Adrian VI as Bishop of Sant'Agata de' Goti.
He served as Bishop of Sant'Agata de' Goti until his death in 1556.

References

External links and additional sources
 (for Chronology of Bishops) 
 (for Chronology of Bishops) 

16th-century Italian Roman Catholic bishops
Bishops appointed by Pope Adrian VI
1556 deaths